"Questing, Not Coasting" is a song by Newcastle-upon-Tyne band Maxïmo Park. It is the second single to be released from their third studio album, Quicken the Heart on 13 July 2009.

The band stated on their website that "Over the last few weeks we've been playing this song live and audiences have responded in a very emotional fashion, so it makes perfect sense for it to be the next single."

It shows a different side to the band than the recent "The Kids Are Sick Again," which newcomers to the band may have heard on the radio. The B-sides are "Too Many Letters" and "That Beating Heart," which has been played most nights of their recent tour.

Track listings
The track listing was revealed via e-mail to fans signed up to the bands mailing list and also made available on their online store.

CD
 "Questing, Not Coasting"
 "Too Many Letters"

7"
 "Questing, Not Coasting" (Acoustic)
 "That Beating Heart"

Digital download
 "Questing, Not Coasting" (Demo Version)

iTunes Download EP
 "Questing, Not Coasting"
 "That Beating Heart"
 "Too Many Letters"
 "Join Our Society" (Alternate version of the track "In Another World (You Would've Found Yourself by Now)")

References

External links

2009 singles
Maxïmo Park songs
Songs written by Paul Smith (rock vocalist)
Song recordings produced by Nick Launay
Songs written by Duncan Lloyd
2009 songs
Warp (record label) singles